Paul Danquah, born Joseph Paul Walcott (25 May 1925 – 13 August 2015), was a British film actor, known particularly for his role in the film A Taste of Honey (1961), adapted from the 1958 play of the same name written by Shelagh Delaney. He later became a barrister and a bank consultant. His father was the Ghanaian statesman J. B. Danquah.

Life and career
He was born Joseph Paul Walcott in London, England, where he grew up. His mother, Bertha May Walcott, was English, and his father Joseph Boakye "J.B." Danquah was a Ghanaian politician and traditional aristocrat; Paul was the eldest of his many children from two marriages and various relationships.

Danquah studied law and was called to the bar at the Inner Temple, as well as in Ghana and in Washington, D.C. He subsequently worked as a consultant with the World Bank until his retirement in 1986, and while living in Washington befriended African-American arts practitioners including Maya Angelou, James Baldwin, Roberta Flack and Nina Simone.

While still a student, Danquah made his acting debut in the British film A Taste of Honey (1961), featuring in the role of Jimmy. He shared a kiss with his co-star Rita Tushingham, which she claims was the first interracial kiss on screen. A review in The New York Times noted: "Paul Danquah in his movie debut as the Negro sailor, is gentle and subtle in a small but demanding role". He presented the BBC Two television series Play School in 1965 and is reported to have been the first black presenter of a children's programme in the UK.

Painter Francis Bacon lived with Danquah and Danquah's partner Peter Pollock (19 November 1919 – 18 July 2001) in their Battersea flat from 1956 to 1961. During this period, in late 1961, Danquah arranged for Don Bachardy to draw Bacon. Danquah moved with Pollock to Tangier, Morocco, in the late 1970s. In the late 1990s, Danquah and Pollock discovered a suitcase containing drawings by Bacon; these drawings were acquired by the Tate in 1996 and exhibited in 1999.

Danquah died in Tangier on 13 August 2015 at the age of 90; according to his niece Meri Nana-Ama Danquah, he was buried in Boubana Cemetery, beside Peter Pollock, as he had requested in his will.

Filmography

Film

Television

References

External links
 Paul Danquah at BFI.
 
 Nana-Ama Danquah, "Actor. Lawyer. Lover of the arts. Her uncle defied category", The Washington Post, 2 June 2016.

1925 births
2015 deaths
20th-century English lawyers
20th-century English male actors
BBC television presenters
British expatriates in Morocco
British officials of the United Nations
Black British male actors
English male film actors
English male television actors
English people of Ghanaian descent
English gay actors
LGBT Black British people
Male actors from London
World Bank people